An anticrystal is a theoretical solid that is completely disordered, making it the opposite of a crystal. The mechanical properties of even a slightly disordered solid can have more in common with an anticrystal than with a crystal.

All naturally occurring crystals contain disordered areas (defects). Scientific descriptions typically assume a perfect crystal, extrapolating from that point based on defect prevalence. However, given sufficient defects, extrapolation from perfect crystals fails. Amorphous materials may display regions with atoms in repeating patterns, but without crystalline order. This means that their properties cannot be inferred from those of a perfect crystal.

The phase transition that occurs when a fluid becomes a disordered solid under pressure is called the jamming transition. Phase transitions occur when a liquid becomes a solid or a gas. Another way of producing a solid is by putting atoms, molecules or larger particles together under high pressure. Extrapolations from the jamming transition showed that even fairly orderly materials exhibited behaviors closer to those of the anticrystal than a perfect crystal.

Anticrystal principles can also provide insight into crystalline materials. For example, strengthening metal alloys often involves shrinking their crystalline areas, such that their behaviors are better described by anticrystals.

References 

Crystals